Randell Edward Jackson (born January 16, 1976) is an American former professional basketball player who played briefly in the National Basketball Association (NBA), among other leagues.

References

1976 births
Living people
Alba Fehérvár players
American expatriate basketball people in Argentina
American expatriate basketball people in China
American expatriate basketball people in Hungary
American expatriate basketball people in Israel
American expatriate basketball people in Mexico
American expatriate basketball people in Spain
American expatriate basketball people in Venezuela
American men's basketball players
Basketball players from Boston
Bnei Hertzeliya basketball players
Cocodrilos de Caracas players
Connecticut Pride players
Dallas Mavericks players
Florida State Seminoles men's basketball players
Fort Wayne Fury players
Hapoel Galil Elyon players
Maccabi Givat Shmuel players
McDonald's High School All-Americans
Panionios B.C. players
Panteras de Aguascalientes players
Power forwards (basketball)
Trotamundos B.B.C. players
Undrafted National Basketball Association players
Washington Wizards players
Xinjiang Flying Tigers players
The Winchendon School alumni